is a Japanese newscaster and tarento represented by Cent Force. She is nicknamed .

Current appearances

Former appearances

TV series
Kaitou mainly appeared on Fuji Television series.

Regular appearances

Guest appearances

Non-Fuji Television guest appearances

Dramas

Radio series

Films

Advertisements

Advertising

Discography

CD

DVD

Music videos

References

External links

Japanese women journalists
Japanese entertainers
1984 births
Living people
People from Yotsukaidō
Waseda University alumni